Blonder and Blonder is the second album by the pop punk band the Muffs, released in 1995 on Reprise Records. The album contains the single "Sad Tomorrow".

Track listing
All songs written by Kim Shattuck.

 "Agony" - 2:27
 "Oh Nina" - 2:39
 "On and On" - 1:45
 "Sad Tomorrow" - 2:09
 "What You've Done" - 1:57
 "Red Eyed Troll" - 3:45
 "End It All" - 1:49
 "Laying on a Bed of Roses" - 2:11
 "I Need a Face" - 2:14
 "Won't Come Out to Play" - 1:51
 "Funny Face" - 3:20
 "Ethyl My Love" - 2:39
 "I'm Confused" - 3:41
 "Just a Game" - 1:59

Non-album tracks
Songs recorded for the album and released as non-album B-sides include:

 "Goodnight Now" - appears on the Sad Tomorrow single.
 "Become Undone" - appears on the Sad Tomorrow single.

All of the B-sides from this album, were released on the B-side compilation album Hamburger.

Personnel
 Kim Shattuck – Guitar, Vocals
 Ronnie Barnett – Bass
 Roy McDonald – Drums
 Rob Cavallo – Producer
 Neill King – Engineer
 The Muffs – Producer

References

External links
The Muffs Discography from Billboard.com 

The Muffs albums
1995 albums
Reprise Records albums